Konstantin Lvovich Vodopyanov (born 8 January 1953) is a Russian physicist from Stanford University. He was awarded the status of Fellow in the American Physical Society, after they were nominated by their Division of Laser Science  in 2009, for "development of a new class of broadly-tunable infrared and terahertz sources based on nonlinear-optical conversion in bulk, micro- and nano- structured media, and their application to spectroscopic studies including demonstration of electromagnetically-induced transparency in quantum wells."

References 

Fellows of the American Physical Society
Russian physicists
Living people
1953 births